Salegentibacter echinorum is a  Gram-negative, heterotrophic, strictly aerobic and non-motile bacterium from the genus of Salegentibacter which has been isolated from a sea urchin (Hemicentrotus pulcherrimus) from the Yellow Sea in China.

References

Flavobacteria
Bacteria described in 2014